Dilara Harun ( – 14 April 2012) was a Bangladeshi freedom fighter and politician from Brahmanbaria belonging to Bangladesh Awami League. She was a member of the Jatiya Sangsad.

Biography
Harun took part in the Liberation War of Bangladesh in 1971. She was the senior vice president of Krishak League. She also served as the vice president of Brahmanbaria unit of Bangladesh Awami League. She was elected as a member of the Jatiya Sangsad from Reserved Women's Seat-26 in the Seventh Jatiya Sangsad Election.

Harun died on 14 April 2012 at National Institute of Cardiovascular Diseases in Dhaka at the age of 66.

References

People from Brahmanbaria district
7th Jatiya Sangsad members
1940s births
2012 deaths
Awami League politicians
People of the Bangladesh Liberation War
Women members of the Jatiya Sangsad
20th-century Bangladeshi women politicians